iTunes Live from Las Vegas Exclusively at the Palms is a live album by the alternative rock band My Morning Jacket, released exclusively through the iTunes Store. The band release some songs of the first albums and the new album Evil Urges and a brand new song "Dear Wife" for this album.

Track listing
 Tonight I Want To Celebrate With You
 Dear Wife
 Knot Comes Loose
 From Nashville To Kentucky
 They Ran
 Thank You Too

Notes
 Track 1 taken from Heartbreakin Man
 Track 3 taken from Z
 Track 4, 5 taken from The Tennessee Fire
 Track 6 taken from Evil Urges

References

My Morning Jacket live albums
Live EPs
2009 live albums
2009 EPs
ATO Records live albums
ITunes-exclusive releases
Live albums recorded in the Las Vegas Valley
My Morning Jacket EPs
ATO Records EPs
Palms Casino Resort